Major General Sir Eustace John Blois Nelson KCVO CB DSO OBE MC (15 June 1912 – 23 December 1993) was a senior British Army officer who commanded the 3rd Battalion, Grenadier Guards during the Second World War and later served as Commandant of the British Sector in Berlin.

Military career
Nelson was born in Hertfordshire, the son of barrister Roland Nelson and Hyla Letitia Grace, sixth daughter of Sir John Ralph Blois, 8th Baronet. He was educated at West Downs School and Eton College, Nelson entered the Royal Military College, Sandhurst where he was commissioned as a second lieutenant into the Grenadier Guards in 1933.

He served in the Second World War, latterly as Commanding Officer (CO) of the 3rd Battalion, Grenadier Guards during the Italian Campaign.

After the war he became CO of the 1st Guards Parachute Battalion in Palestine, before transferring to the War Office as a General Staff Officer (GSO) in 1948. He was CO of the 1st Battalion, Grenadier Guards in Tripoli from 1950 until 1952, when he became a GSO at London District. In 1954 he joined the British military staff in Washington, D.C. and in 1959 he commanded the 4th Guards Brigade Group in Germany. He was made Major-General commanding the Household Brigade and General Officer Commanding (GOC) London District in 1962 and Commandant of the British Sector in Berlin in 1966. He retired from the British Army in 1968.

Following his death in 1993, a memorial service was held at Wellington Barracks, London.

Family
He married Lady Margaret Jane Fitzroy, granddaughter of the 8th Duke of Grafton, who was granted the rank of a duke's daughter in 1936. In 1999, their elder daughter, Jennifer Forwood, received the title of Baroness Arlington, which had been abeyant since the death of Nelson's brother-in-law the 9th Duke of Grafton in 1936.
Their second daughter, Juliet Auriol Sally Nelson, married Captain Sir Montague John Cholmeley, 6th Bt.

References

Further reading
 

|-

1912 births
1993 deaths
People educated at West Downs School
People educated at Eton College
Knights Commander of the Royal Victorian Order
Companions of the Order of the Bath
Companions of the Distinguished Service Order
Officers of the Order of the British Empire
Recipients of the Military Cross
British Army generals
British Army personnel of World War II
Grenadier Guards officers
Military personnel from Hertfordshire
People from Shenley